This Must Be the Place may refer to:

Film
 This Must Be the Place (film), a 2011 drama film directed by Paolo Sorrentino

Music
 "This Must Be the Place" (Naive Melody), a 1983 song by Talking Heads
 This Must Be the Place (album), a 1985 album by Morrissey-Mullen
 This Must Be the Place, a 1992 album by Mark Korven

Literature
 This Must Be the Place: Memoirs of Montparnasse, 1937, repub.1989. James "Jimmie" Charters, ed. Morrill Cody
 This Must Be the Place: The Adventures of Talking Heads in the Twentieth Century, a 2010 book by David Bowman
 This Must Be the Place, a 2008 novel by Anna Winger
 This Must Be the Place, a 2010 novel by Kate Racculia
 This Must Be the Place, a 2017 novel by Maggie O'Farrell
 This Must Be the Place (art book), 2010, featuring 43 contemporary Swedish artists